Elisabeth Böckel was a German figure skater who competed in ladies' singles and pair skating.

She won the bronze medal in ladies' single skating at the 1925 World Figure Skating Championships.

Competitive highlights

Ladies' singles

Pairs 
With Otto Hayek

References 

German female single skaters
German female pair skaters
Date of birth missing
Date of death missing
20th-century German women